HMS Manly was a Yarrow M-class destroyer of the British Royal Navy. Built by the Scottish shipbuilder Yarrow between 1913 and 1914, Manly served during the First World War. She formed part of the Harwich Force in the early years of the war, and then later in the English Channel as part of the Dover Patrol taking part in the Zeebrugge Raid in 1918. She survived the war, and was sold for scrap in 1920.

Design and construction
For the 1913–1914 shipbuilding programme for the Royal Navy, the British Admiralty, prompted by the First Lord of the Admiralty, Winston Churchill, had a requirement for faster destroyers than those built in previous years, in order to match reported German ships. The Admiralty first ordered two builder's specials each from the experienced destroyer builders Yarrow, Thornycroft and Hawthorn Leslie, to the builder's own designs, with another ship ordered to Yarrow's design in May 1913, and then ordered six to the standard admiralty design.

Three Yarrow water-tube boilers fed steam to Brown-Curtis impulse steam turbines, driving two propeller shafts.

The ships were armed with three 4-inch (102 mm) QF Mk 4 guns, together with two 2-pounder pom-pom anti-aircraft autocannons. Two twin 21-inch (533mm torpedo tubes were fitted. The ships had a crew of 79.

Manly, the third of the Yarrow-built specials, was laid down at Yarrow's Scotstoun shipyard on 12 May 1913 and launched on 12 October 1914. She reached a speed of  during sea trials and was completed in November 1914. Contract price was £118,221.

Service
Manly joined the Harwich Force on completion, which operated in the North Sea and could reinforce the Grand Fleet or forces in the English Channel as required. On 31 January 1915, Manly was one of seven destroyers of the Harwich Force dispatched to Sheerness to make part in minelaying operations east of the Straits of Dover to restrict the movements of German U-Boats. They continued escorting the minelayer Paris until 9 February. On 28 March, four destroyers of the Harwich force (and  carried out an anti-submarine sweep off the Dutch coast. When a submarine was sighted, six more destroyers of the Harwich Force, including Manly, were sent to reinforce the patrol, but shortly after the two groups of destroyers met up, the force was recalled as radio intercepts indicated that German battlecruisers were about to sortie.

On 13 June 1915, the 10th Destroyer Flotilla, including Manly was ordered to Avonmouth  for operations in the South-West Approaches, and in particular, to escort troopships carrying the 13th Division to the Middle East on the initial part of their journey, with two destroyers per transport. After the 13th Division had all left, the 10th Flotilla continued on escort duties based at Devonport, escorting the ships carrying the next division to be sent to the Gallipoli campaign, the 12th Division. Manly ran aground in thick fog just outside Queenstown, however, leaving Aquitania with only Mentor and Miranda as escort.

On 16 August 1915, 8 destroyers of the 10th Flotilla, including Manly, escorted the minelayer  which was tasked with laying a minefield on the Arum Bank. The force encountered five patrolling German destroyers, and the German destroyer  torpedoed the destroyer , blowing off  Mentors bows, and then turned away. This caused the operation to be abandoned. Despite the damage, Mentor made it safely back to Harwich. Little damage was done, and the lock gates of the port, the principal objective of the operation, were untouched. On 6 October 1915, the Harwich Force set out on a sweep off the Danish coast. The force captured 15 German fishing trawlers and sunk another on 7 October, with Manly being responsible for at least one of the captures, the West, which was later operated by the Royal Navy in the Mediterranean as the Cordwosin.

On 25 December 1915, Manly was one of eight destroyers from the Harwich Force that were ordered with the leader  to the Channel as a result of attacks by the German submarine U-24.  On 24 March 1916, the Harwich Force took part in a raid by seaplanes launched by the seaplane carrier  against a German airship base believed to be at Hoyer on the coast of Schleswig, with Manly sailing as part of the escort. The air attack was unsuccessful, with the airship base not being at Hoyer as thought, but at Tondern further inland. The destroyer  was sunk after a collision with the destroyer , while later in the day, in an encounter with German torpedo boats, the cruiser  rammed and sunk the German torpedo-boat , but was then rammed herself by the cruiser , damaging both cruisers.

On the night of 23/24 July 1916, eight destroyers and two light cruiser of the Harwich force set out on a patrol to protect shipping passing between Britain and the Netherlands from German attack, with the force being divided into two divisions, with Manly forming part of the 1st Division, led by the cruiser . The division sighted three German destroyers and set off in pursuit, but the German force escaped under cover of a rain squall and a heavy smoke screen. The second division, led by the cruiser , also encountered the three German destroyers, but the German force managed to reach Zeebrugge safely.

In December 1916, Manly was one of eight destroyers of the 10th Flotilla sent with Nimrod to Dunkirk to strengthen defences in the Channel against raids by German surface forces, but on 23 January, she, along with Nimrod and five other destroyers, was ordered to take part, with the Harwich Force, in an operation to intercept a flotilla of 11 German torpedo boats that were being sent from Germany to reinforce their naval forces in Belgium. In total six light cruisers, two leaders and 16 destroyers were deployed to intercept the German force. The German force avoided Manlys group, but ran into three British light cruisers, with the torpedo-boats  and  damaged by British shellfire and collision before escaping. The torpedo boat , which had lost contact with the rest of the German flotilla, encountered the British destroyer  and torpedoed and sunk the British ship before escaping.

Manly transferred to the Dover Patrol on 8 May 1917, and on 5 June escorted the monitors  and  when they bombarded Ostend. The bombardment sank the submarine [[SM UC-70|UC-70]], and two barges, and damaged three torpedo boats. Manly was still part of the Dover Patrol in July 1917.Manly took part in the Raid on Zeebrugge on 23 April 1918, escorting the monitors Erebus and Terror. She remained part of the Dover patrol at the end of the war.

DisposalManly'' was sold for scrap to the Barking Ship Breaking Company on 26 October 1921.

Pennant numbers

Notes

Citations

Bibliography

M-class destroyers (1913)
1914 ships
Ships built on the River Clyde